Madhav Ramadasan  is an Indian film director, screenwriter and actor, who works in Malayalam film industry.

Personal life
Madhav Ramadasan was born to P. Madhavan and T.P. Radha at Kalluvazhi near Ottapalam. He did his schooling at AKNM-MA Memorial High School, Kattukulam.

Film career
He started his career by working in documentary, advertising and short films. He then worked as an associate director with R. Sarath in the Malayalam feature films Sthithi and Sayahnam. He made his directorial debut with the legal thriller Melvilasom in 2011. The film was an adaptation of a play written by Soorya Krishna Moorthy which itself was based on the Hindi play Court Martial by Swadesh Deepak. The film received wide critical acclaim and won numerous awards. In 2014, he directed the medical thriller Apothecary which portrayed relationship between a doctor and his patients. In 2019 he directed Ilayaraja  which had Guinness Pakru playing the main character.

Filmography

References

Malayalam film directors
Malayali people
Living people
1975 births